Lydian (𐤮𐤱𐤠𐤭𐤣𐤶𐤯𐤦𐤳 Sfardẽtiš "[language] of Sardis") is an extinct Indo-European Anatolian language spoken in the region of Lydia, in western Anatolia (now in Turkey). The language is attested in graffiti and in coin legends from the late 8th century or the early 7th century to the 3rd century BCE, but well-preserved inscriptions of significant length are so far limited to the 5th century and the 4th century BCE, during the period of Persian domination. Thus, Lydian texts are effectively contemporaneous with those in Lycian.

Strabo mentions that around his time (1st century BCE), the Lydian language was no longer spoken in Lydia proper but was still being spoken among the multicultural population of Kibyra (now Gölhisar) in southwestern Anatolia, by the descendants of the Lydian colonists, who had founded the city.

Text corpus and decipherment 

In 1916 the Sardis bilingual inscription, a bilingual inscription in Aramaic and Lydian allowed Enno Littmann to decipher the Lydian language. From an analysis of the two parallel texts, he identified the alphabetic signs, most of them correctly, established a basic vocabulary, attempted translation of a dozen unilingual texts, gave an outline of Lydian grammar, and even recognized peculiar poetical characteristics in several texts. Eight years later William Hepburn Buckler presented a collection of 51 inscriptions then known. The 109 inscriptions known by 1986 have been treated comprehensively by Roberto Gusmani; new texts keep being found from time to time.

All but a few of the extant Lydian texts have been found in or near Sardis, the Lydian capital, but fewer than 30 of the inscriptions consist of more than a few words or are reasonably complete. Most of the inscriptions are on marble or stone and are sepulchral in content, but several are decrees of one sort or another, and some half-dozen texts seem to be in verse, with a stress-based meter and vowel assonance at the end of the line. Tomb inscriptions include many epitaphs, which typically begin with the words 𐤤𐤮 𐤥𐤠𐤫𐤠𐤮 es wãnas ("this grave"). The short texts are mostly graffiti, coin legends, seals, potter's marks, and the like. The language of the Ionian Greek poet Hipponax (sixth century BCE, born at Ephesus) is interspersed with Lydian words, many of them from popular slang.

Classification 
Within the Anatolian group, Lydian occupies a unique and problematic position. One reason is the still very limited evidence and understanding of the language. Another reason is a number of features that are not shared with any other Anatolian language. It is still not known whether those differences represent developments peculiar to pre-Lydian or the retention in Lydian of archaic features that were lost in the other Anatolian languages. Until more satisfactory knowledge becomes available, the status of Lydian within Anatolian remains a "special" one.

Writing system

The Lydian script, which is strictly alphabetic, consists of 26 signs:

The script is related to or derived from that of Greek as well as its western Anatolian neighbours, the exact relationship still remaining unclear. The direction of writing in the older texts is either from left to right or right to left. Later texts show exclusively the latter. Use of word-dividers is variable. The texts were found chiefly at the ancient capital of Sardis and include decrees and epitaphs, some of which were composed in verse; most were written during the 5th century and the 4th century BCE, but a few may have been created as early as the 7th century.

Phonology

Vowels 
Lydian has seven vowels: 𐤠 a, 𐤤 e, 𐤦 i, 𐤬 o, 𐤰 u, 𐤵 ã, and 𐤶 ẽ, the last two being nasal vowels, typically before a (synchronic or diachronic) nasal consonant (like n or m). The vowels e, o, ã, and ẽ occur only when accented. A vowel or glide 𐤧 y appears rarely, only in the oldest inscriptions, and probably indicates an allophone of i or e that is perhaps unstressed.

Lydian is notable for its extensive consonant clusters, which resulted from the loss of word-final short vowels, together with massive syncope; there may have been an unwritten [ə] in such sequences.

Consonants 
(Note: until recently the Buckler (1924) transliteration scheme was often used, which may lead to confusion. This older system wrote v, s, and ś, instead of today's w (𐤥), š (𐤳), and s (𐤮). The modern system renders the sibilants more naturally and prevents confusion between w and the Greek nu symbol ν = 𐤸.)

Voicing was likely not distinctive in Lydian. However /p t k/ are voiced before nasals and apparently before /r/. The palatal affricate (τ) and sibilant (š) may have been palato-alveolar.

The sign 𐤣 has traditionally been transliterated d and interpreted as an interdental /ð/ resulting from the sound change *i̯ > ð or the lenition of Proto-Anatolian *t. However, it has recently been argued that in all contexts d in fact represents the palatal glide /j/, previously considered absent from Lydian. An interdental /ð/ would stand as the only interdental sound in Lydian phonology, whereas a palatal interpretation of d is complemented by a full series of other palatal consonants: λ, š, ν, and τ.

Lydian, with its many palatal and nasal sounds, must have sounded quite strange to the ears of ancient Greeks, and transcription of Lydian names into Greek would therefore present some difficulties. Recently a case has been made that the Lydian word Qλdãns, pronounced /kʷɾʲ'ðãns/, both meaning 'king' and the name of a god, could correspond to the Greek Κροῖσος, or Croesus, the last Lydian king, whose kingdom was conquered by the Persians. If the identification is correct it would have the interesting historical consequence that king Croesus was not saved from being burnt at the stake, as Herodotus tells us, but chose suicide and was subsequently deified.

Stress 
Heiner Eichner developed rules to determine which syllable in a word has the stress accent. In short, the rules are:
 Syllables with vowel -ã-, -ẽ-, -e-, -o-, -aa-, and -ii- always have stress. Syllables with -i- (-y-), -a- or -u- may be accented or unaccented.
 Enclitics (-aν-, -in-, -it-, etc.) never have stress.
 Prefixes, even those with a long vowel (ẽn-, ẽt-), do not have stress.
 An -a- before a nasal (m, n, ν) never has stress.
 In consonant clusters syllabic liquidae (l, λ, r), nasals (m, n, ν) and sibilants (s, š) do not have stress.
 Within a declension or conjugation stress does not move from one syllable to another.
A useful application of those rules is the investigation of metres in Lydian poetry.

Morphology

Nouns
Nouns and adjectives distinguish singular and plural forms. Words in the texts are predominantly singular. Plural forms are scarce, and a dual has not been found in Lydian. There are two genders: animate (or 'common') and inanimate (or 'neuter'). Only three cases are securely attested: nominative, accusative, and dative-locative. A genitive case seems to be present in the plural, but in the singular usually a so-called possessive is used instead, which is similar to the Luwic languages: a suffix -li is added to the root of a substantive, and thus an adjective is formed that is declined in turn. However, recently it has been defended that a form ending in -l, formerly thought to be an "endingless" variant of the possessive, was indeed a genitive singular. Of an ablative case there are only a few uncertain examples.

Nouns, adjectives, and pronomina are all declined according to a similar paradigm:

Substantives 
Examples of substantives:

Adjectives 
Examples of adjectives:

Pronomina 
Examples of pronomina:

Verbs
Just as in other Anatolian languages verbs in Lydian were conjugated in the present-future and preterite tenses with three persons singular and plural. Imperative or gerundive forms have not been found yet. Singular forms are often hard to distinguish from plural forms in the third person present active (both ending in -t/-d): the plural form seems to be in principle nasalized, but this could not always be expressed in the writing.

Lydian distinguished a mediopassive voice with the third-person singular ending -t(a)λ or -daλ (derived from Proto-Anatolian *-tori; -t(a)λ after consonant stems and part of the stems ending in a vowel, -daλ when lenited after other stems ending in a vowel or glide).

About a dozen conjugations can be distinguished, on the basis of (1) the verbal root ending (a-stems, consonant stems, -ši-stems, etc.), and (2) the endings of the third person singular being either unlenited (-t; -tλ, -taλ) or lenited (-d; -dλ, -daλ). For example, šarpta-(t) (to inscribe, to carve) is an unlenited a-stem (šarptat, he inscribes), qaλmλa-(d) (to be king) is a lenited a-stem (qaλmλad, he rules). Differences between the various conjugations are minor.

Many Lydian verbs are composite, using prefixes such as ẽn- (= 'in-'?), ẽt- (= 'into-'), fa-/f- ('then, subsequently, again'?), šaw-, and kat-/kaτ- (= 'down-'?), and suffixes like -ãn-/-ẽn- (durative?), -no-/-νo- (causative?), -ši- (iterative?), and -ki- or -ti- (denominative?); their meaning is often difficult to determine.

Examples of verbal conjugation:

Particles 
To emphasize where an important next part of a sentence begins, Lydian uses a series of enclitic particles that can be affixed to a pivotal word. Examples of such "emphatic" enclitics are -in-, -it-/-iτ-, -t-/-τ-, -at-, and -m-/-um-. When stacked and combined with other suffixes (such as pronomina, or the suffix -k = 'and') veritable clusters are formed. The word ak = 'so..., so if...' provides many examples:
 akτin (= ak-τ-in) - 'so...', 'so if...', 'yea, if...'
 akmsin (= ak-m-s-in) - 'so if he...' (-s- = 'he'), or (= ak-ms-in) - 'so if to them...' (-ms- = 'to them')
 akmλt (= ak-m-λ-t) - 'so if to him...' (-λ- = 'to him'); etc.

Syntax
The basic word order is subject-object-verb, but constituents may be extraposed to the right of the verb. Like other Anatolian languages, Lydian features clause-initial particles with enclitic pronouns attached in a chain. It also has a number of preverbs and at least one postposition. Modifiers of a noun normally precede it.

Sample text and vocabulary

The Lydian bilingual 
In May 1912 American excavators at the Sardis necropolis discovered a bilingual inscription in Lydian and Aramaic. Being among the first texts found, it provided a limited equivalent of the Rosetta Stone and permitted a first understanding of the Lydian language.

The first line of the Lydian text has been destroyed, but can be reconstructed from its Aramaic counterpart.

Vocabulary 
Examples of words in the bilingual:
 𐤬𐤭𐤠 – ora – month; cf. Greek ὥρα (season, year, moment), Latin hora (hour), English hour
 𐤩𐤠𐤲𐤭𐤦𐤳𐤠 – laqriša –  wall, walls (traditional translation); letters, inscription (?)
 𐤡𐤦𐤭𐤠 – bira – house
 𐤲𐤦𐤭𐤠 – qira – field, ground, immovable property
 𐤨 – -k (suffix) – and; cf. Greek τε, Latin -que = and

Other words with Indo-European roots and with modern cognates:
 𐤲𐤦𐤳 – qiš – who; cf. Greek τίς, Latin quis, French qui
 𐤡𐤭𐤠𐤱𐤭𐤮 – brafrs – community, brotherhood; cf. Latin frater, English brother, French frère
 𐤹𐤦𐤥𐤳 – ciwš – god; cf. Greek Ζεύς, Latin deus, French dieu (god)
 𐤠𐤷𐤠𐤮 – aλas – other; cf. Greek ἄλλος (other; is an element in words such as allogamy, allomorph, allopathy, allotropy), Latin alius (other), alter (another, the other one, second), French autre

Only a small fraction of the Lydian vocabulary is clearly of Indo-European stock. Gusmani provides lists of words that have been linked to Hittite, various other Indo-European languages, and Etruscan.

Lydian words still in use

Labrys (Greek: λάβρυς, lábrys) is the term for a symmetrical double-bitted axe originally from Crete in Greece, one of the oldest symbols of Greek civilization. The priests at Delphi in classical Greece were called Labryades (the men of the double axe). 
The term labrys "double-axe" is not found in any surviving Lydian inscription, but on the subject, Plutarch states that "the Lydians call the axe labrys" (Λυδοὶ γὰρ ‘λάβρυν’ τὸν πέλεκυν ὀνομάζουσι).

Another possibly Lydian loanword may be tyrant "absolute ruler", which was first used in Ancient Greek sources, without negative connotations, for the late 8th century or early 7th century BCE. It is possibly derived from the native town of King Gyges of Lydia, founder of the Mermnad dynasty, which was Tyrrha in classical antiquity and is now Tire, Turkey. Yet another is the element molybdenum, borrowed from Ancient Greek , "lead", from Mycenaean Greek mo-ri-wo-do, which in Lydian was mariwda- "dark".
All of those loanwords confirm a strong cultural interaction between the Lydians and the Greeks since the Creto-Mycenaean era (2nd millennium BCE).

Lydian poetry 
In his seminal decipherment of Lydian texts Littmann noted that at least five of them show two poetical aspects:

 First, assonance: all lines have the same vocal (o, or a, or i) in the last syllable. One of the longest inscriptions, 19 lines, has in each line an o in the last syllable. Littmann sensationally labeled these assonances "the earliest rhyme in the history of human literature", though the word 'rhyme' is slightly misleading because the consonants in the last syllables do vary (... factot / ... tasok / ... arktoλ, etc.).
 Secondly, the poetic texts apparently show a metre: lines have twelve (sometimes eleven or ten) syllables with a caesura before the fifth or sixth syllable from the end. The twelve-syllable lines often sound like anapestic tetrameters.

Also, partly in order to achieve assonance and metre ("metri causa"), in poetic texts word order is more free than in prose.

Martin West, after comparing historical metres in various Indo-European languages, concluded that the Lydian metres seem to be compatible with reconstructed common Proto-Indo-European metres. The Lydians probably borrowed these metres from the Greeks; however, the assonance was a unique innovation of their own.

Only one text shows mixed character: a poetical middle part is sandwiched in between a prose introduction and a prose conclusion. Analogous to the bilingual text the introduction tells who built the monument (a certain Karos), and for whom (both his son and his ancestors), while the final sentence of the original inscription may be the usual curse for those who would dare to damage it. The poetic middle part seems to claim that the monument was built after consulting a divine oracle, cited between Lydian "quotation marks" ▷...▷, and continues with an appeal to pay as much respect to the builder as to the venerable forefathers.

It is remarkable that clear examples of rhyme (like the stock expression aaraλ biraλ-k, 'house and yard', cf. German 'Haus und Hof') and alliteration (kλidaλ kofuλ-k qiraλ qelλ-k, 'land and water, property and estate') are absent in the poetical texts, but do occur in the prose bilingual.

See also

Lydian script

References

Sources

External links

 
Lydian Corpus
Palaeolexicon - Word study tool of Ancient languages, including a Lydian dictionary
The Grammar of the Lydian Language by Cyril Babaev (Retrieved 2021-02-01)

 The Archaeological Exploration of Sardis (Sardis Expedition Project) (Retrieved 2021-02-13)

Further reading

 
 
 
 
 
 
 

Lydian language
Anatolian languages
Extinct languages of Asia
Languages attested from the 8th century BC